Dance Charlie Dance is a 1937 American comedy film directed by Frank McDonald and written by Crane Wilbur and William Jacobs, based on the play The Butter and Egg Man by George S. Kaufman, which opened on Broadway on September 23, 1925 and ran for 243 performances. The film stars Stuart Erwin, Jean Muir, Glenda Farrell and Allen Jenkins and features Addison Richards. It was released by Warner Bros. on August 14, 1937.

The story concerns a stage-struck rural heir who is tricked into financing a bad play, but when the play turns out to be a hit, problems arise when he is sued for plagiarism.

Plot
Andrew Tucker is from a small town and arrives in the big city in hopes of investing in theatrical production, he finds Morgan, a producer with a reputation of producing flops and decides to invest in a bad play, that bad play turns out to be a success as an unintentional comedy.

Cast        
Stuart Erwin as Andrew "Andy" Tucker
Jean Muir as Mary Mathews
Glenda Farrell as Fanny Morgan
Allen Jenkins as Alf Morgan
Addison Richards as Gordon Fox
Mary Treen as Jennie Wolfe
Charley Foy as Phil "Mac" MacArthur 
Chester Clute as Alvin Gussett
Collette Lyons as Bobbie Benson

References

External links

1937 films
1930s English-language films
Warner Bros. films
American comedy films
1937 comedy films
Films directed by Frank McDonald
American black-and-white films
1930s American films
English-language comedy films